Oryzias marmoratus, also known as the marmorated ricefish or marmorated medaka, is a species of fish in the family Adrianichthyidae, from Lake Towuti, Lake Mahalona, Lake Lontoa and associated streams in Sulawesi, Indonesia.

Information
Oryzias marmoratus is endemic to Indonesia. They are a vulnerable species. This species is found in freshwater within a benthopelagic range. It is native to tropical climates. They are considered to be a species that does not migrate. The males are of a grayish-brown color on the head with darker brown splotches on the body. This species is a non-annual breeder. It can be kept as an aquarium species, but it is known to be very difficult to do so. Humans use them for the commercial aquarium trade.

References

marmoratus
Freshwater fish of Indonesia
Taxa named by Horst Joachim Aurich
Taxonomy articles created by Polbot
Fish described in 1935